Novalyne Price Ellis (March 9, 1908 – March 30, 1999) was an American schoolteacher and writer who became close friends with and occasionally dated famed pulp fiction writer Robert E. Howard.

Biography
Price was for the most part raised on a farm in Brownwood, Texas. With aspirations of becoming a writer, Price became a school teacher to pay for her education at Daniel Baker College and later Louisiana State University. Price taught English, public speaking and history between 1934 and 1936 at Cross Plains High School. Cross Plains was also home to writer Robert E. Howard, to whom Price had been briefly introduced in 1933. Price initially sought out Howard for advice as to how she could get her writing published. Common interests and personal chemistry, however, created a strong bond of friendship between the two. Despite personality differences, misunderstandings, and unsuccessful attempts to bring their relationship beyond casual dating, Price and Howard remained close until Howard's suicide in 1936. After Howard's death, Price shifted her focus away from a writing career and strove to become the best teacher she could be, ultimately remaining a teacher until her retirement.

On October 2, 1942 Price married John Douglas Robarts. Robarts was a Second Lieutenant serving in the US Army Infantry. They adopted a child, Marvin Douglas. Price and Robarts were divorced in May 1946.

While working as a teacher at Daniel Baker College, Price met and, in 1947, married William Ellis. Price and Ellis resided in Louisiana and had one son, Marvin Douglas Ellis, born in 1949.  Price's love of teaching and gift at speechwriting was recognized in 1981 with her admittance into the National Forensic Hall of Fame. Her marriage to Ellis lasted forty-seven years, until Ellis' death in 1994. Price continued living alone in Lafayette, Louisiana until her death at age 91 on March 30, 1999.

Legacy
Throughout her life, Price did sell a number of articles and short stories, but it is her 1986 memoir, One Who Walked Alone, about her relationship with Howard for which she is best known. The 1996 movie, The Whole Wide World, starring Vincent D'Onofrio and Renée Zellweger is a direct adaptation of One Who Walked Alone.

Works
A Handbook for Student Teachers of Speech (1957), Lafayette Senior High School, Lafayette, La 
One Who Walked Alone: Robert E. Howard, The Final Years (1986)
Day of the Stranger: Further Memories of Robert E. Howard (1989)

External links
"The True Story After The Whole Wide World"

Robert E. Howard
1908 births
1999 deaths
People from Abilene, Texas
Schoolteachers from Texas
20th-century American educators
20th-century American women educators
20th-century American memoirists
American women memoirists
20th-century American women writers
Daniel Baker College alumni
Louisiana State University alumni